Percival Molson Memorial Stadium (also known in French as Stade Percival-Molson; commonly referred to as Molson Stadium in English or Stade Molson in French) is an outdoor football stadium in Downtown Montreal, on the slopes of Mount Royal, in the borough of Ville-Marie.  Named in honour of Percival Molson, and owned by McGill University, it was the home of the Montreal Alouettes of the Canadian Football League from 1954 to 1967 and again since 1998. The stadium is also home to the McGill Redbirds and Martlets of the RSEQ, the Montreal Royal of the American Ultimate Disc League, the Selwyn House Gryphons high-school football team and the Canadian Corporate Soccer League, the largest amateur corporate league in Canada.

History

Constructed in 1914 on the slopes of Mount Royal, at the corner of University and Pine (avenue Des Pins), the stadium sat dormant through World War I with the cessation of football from 1914 to 1918. On July 5, 1917, Captain Percival Molson (1880–1917), great-grandson of brewer John Molson and a McGill University alumnus and sports star who had been instrumental in getting the stadium plan approved, was killed in action in France. His will left $75,000 to the university to help pay most of the total costs for the completion of the stadium. Other individual donors whose generosity built and renovated the stadium were William C. Macdonald and John W. McConnell. Designed by Percy Erskine Nobbs, the stadium was officially dedicated as "McGill Graduates' Stadium" at an intercollegiate track meet on October 22, 1915; it was renamed "Percival Molson Memorial Stadium" on October 25, 1919 by the university's Board of Governors, in his honour.

The Montreal Alouettes played at the stadium from 1954 to 1967 before moving to the Autostade. An attempted return to the Molson Stadium in 1972 was not successful and the team went back to the Autostade the following season. When the revived Alouettes franchise was forced to move a 1997 playoff game out of Olympic Stadium due to a U2 concert scheduled for the day of the game, they played the game at Molson Stadium before a sellout crowd, prompting the Als to make it their primary home again the following season. However, all playoff games were played at Olympic Stadium until 2015. Percival Molson Stadium is also home of the Selwyn House Gryphons and the McGill football and rugby teams.

The only Grey Cup game played at Molson Stadium was in 1931, which was the first time the Grey Cup had been contested outside of Ontario. It also served as a venue for field hockey, during the 1976 Summer Olympics. It seated 20,202 and had been sold out for Alouettes games from August 12, 1999 until 2009.  A renovation project begun in 2009 increased capacity from 20,202 to over 25,000 before seats were removed in 2014 to reduce capacity to 23,420.  The seating capacity was lowered to 20,025 following a reconfiguration prior to the 2019 season.

The Alouettes' decision to return to the venue was problematic because the team was being sponsored by the Labatt Brewing Company and the stadium shared the name of its major competitor, Molson, though not named for it. Eventually, the team chose to change sponsors and have been sponsored by Budweiser since 2014. In 2004, The Alouettes installed a FieldTurf surface at Molson Stadium replacing the old-style Astroturf.

Renovation

Molson Stadium has been renovated and expanded, adding nearly 5,000 seats in time for the 2010 CFL season. The project to see the smallest CFL stadium increase to a seating capacity of 25,012 cost $29.4 million. 

Eleven rows were removed from the south side of the stadium to construct a second tier and add the majority of the new seats, about 3,800. Also, temporary bleachers in the east end-zone were replaced with 1,500 permanent seats, a new section was added to the northeast corner, and 19 new private suites were constructed. The cost of the renovations were shared by the Quebec government ($19.3 million), the city of Montreal ($4 million), and Robert Wetenhall, the Alouettes' owner ($6,023,935).

Layout
Because the playing surface is surrounded by a running track, the full 65-yard width and 20-yard length of the end zones is not available at the two end lines. However, the full width is available for more than half of each end zone, with the only missing pieces being the relatively small bits off the corners. Since the 2014 CFL season, it is the only stadium in the CFL to cut the corners on the end zones after Edmonton's Commonwealth Stadium squared off theirs.

See also
List of Canadian Football League stadiums

References

External links

 
Percival Molson Stadium under construction
Welcome to the brand new stadium!
Alouettes luxury boxes available!

Canadian Football League venues
Soccer venues in Montreal
McGill Redbirds football
Molson family
Montreal Alouettes
Sports venues in Montreal
Venues of the 1976 Summer Olympics
Olympic field hockey venues
Mount Royal
McGill University buildings
University sports venues in Canada
Percy Erskine Nobbs buildings
Ultimate (sport) venues
1915 establishments in Quebec
Sports venues completed in 1915
Canadian football venues in Quebec